The Atlantic 10 Conference basetball tournament, sometimes referred to simply as the A-10 tournament, is the conference baseball championship of the NCAA Division I Atlantic 10 Conference.  The top seven finishers in the regular season of the conference's twelve teams advance to the double-elimination tournament, which in 2017 will be played at Billiken Sports Center in St. Louis, Missouri.  The winner of the tournament receives an automatic berth to the NCAA Division I Baseball Championship.

Champions

By year
The following is a list of conference champions and sites listed by year.

By school
The following is a list of conference champions listed by school.

Italics indicate that the program is no longer an Atlantic 10 member.

References